Alexander More may refer to:

 Alexander Morus (1616–1670), or More, Franco-Scottish Calvinist preacher
 Alexander Goodman More (1830–1895), British naturalist